Qadim (also Romanized as Qadīm) is a village in Mahmudabad Rural District, in the Central District of Shahin Dezh County, West Azerbaijan Province, Iran. At the 2006 census, its population was 208, in 36 families.

References 

Populated places in Shahin Dezh County